Brenton See (born 1985/1986) is an Australian artist, known for painting murals, especially of birds.

See, whose mother is also an artist, studied graphic design at a technical and further education (TAFE) college and undertook an apprenticeship as a tattoo artist.

Locations for his murals include Perth Zoo.

See, a resident of the Fremantle suburb Hilton, has written on his website:

Works 

See's public murals include:

See also 

 Sarah Yates, aka Faunagraphic, a similar artist, working in Sheffield, England

References

External links 
 
 , with pictures of his works

Australian muralists
Living people
Year of birth missing (living people)
Place of birth missing (living people)
1980s births
21st-century Australian painters
Australian bird artists
People from Fremantle
Artists from Perth, Western Australia